Thomas Che Goldstein (born 1970) is an American lawyer known for his advocacy before and blogging about the Supreme Court of the United States. He was a founding partner of Goldstein and Howe (now Goldstein & Russell), a Washington, D.C., firm specializing in Supreme Court litigation, and was, until the end of 2010, a partner at Akin Gump, where he was co-head of the litigation and Supreme Court practices. He retired from Goldstein & Russell in March 2023. In 2003, he co-founded SCOTUSblog, the most widely read blog covering the Supreme Court, and remains the publisher and occasional contributor, providing analyses and summaries of Supreme Court decisions and cert petitions. He has taught Supreme Court Litigation at Harvard Law School since 2004, and at Stanford Law School from 2004-2012.

Education
He graduated from the University of North Carolina at Chapel Hill with a Bachelor of Arts in 1992 and from the American University Washington College of Law with a Juris Doctor in 1995. After law school he clerked for Chief Judge Patricia Wald of the U.S. Court of Appeals for the D.C. Circuit.

Supreme Court practice

Over the past fifteen years, Goldstein has served as one of the lawyers for one of the parties in just under 10% of the cases argued before the Supreme Court. Goldstein has argued 30 cases himself.

Notably, Goldstein served as second chair for Laurence Tribe and David Boies on behalf of Vice President Al Gore in Bush v. Gore.  He also served as second chair for Laurence Tribe on New York Times Co. v. Tasini (decided in 2001).

"The Hustler," an April 2006 article by Noam Scheiber in The New Republic, asserted that Goldstein has had an out-sized impact on the Supreme Court, going so far as to suggest the Court was the "Goldstein Court," a phraseology usually reserved for the Chief Justice of the United States during a particular period (e.g. "Roberts Court", "Rehnquist Court", "Taft Court"), but the article offered no empirical data to support that claim.

The article focuses on the practice pioneered by Goldstein of identifying and pursuing cases that are likely to be reviewed by the Supreme Court.  At the time, the practice was extremely controversial and analogized to ambulance chasing by established members of the bar, including by now-Chief Justice John Roberts, who quipped about contacting the lawyers in cases that if you needed a heart-surgeon, you would not pick the one who called you out of the blue.  The practice has since become commonplace among almost all law firm Supreme Court practices and the several Supreme Court litigation clinics in law schools.

Blog

Goldstein founded SCOTUSblog, a prominent blog covering the Supreme Court. In 2013, SCOTUSblog received the Peabody Award for excellence in electronic media. It is the first blog ever to receive the Peabody. It also won the 2013 Society of Professional Journalists (Sigma Delta Chi) prize for deadline reporting for its coverage of the Supreme Court's healthcare ruling. Furthermore, it serves as a constantly updated site for information and news about the Supreme Court — the submissions of new petitions, decisions concerning certiorari, decisions concerning stays of lower court decisions — particularly executions, oral arguments, and final decisions in all cases. In 2010, SCOTUSblog became the only weblog to receive the American Bar Association’s Silver Gavel Award for fostering public understanding of the law.  While generally regarded as objective, the blog (and Goldstein) on occasion is the subject of criticism from commentators on both the left (such as Glenn Greenwald) and the right (such as Ed Whelan).

Other notable activities
Goldstein has taught Supreme Court Litigation at Harvard Law School since 2004, and at Stanford Law School from 2004-2012.

In 2013, Goldstein was elected to the American Law Institute and he currently serves as an Adviser on ALI's Restatement Third, Torts: Intentional Torts to Persons.

American Bar Association: Secretary of the Labor and Employment Section, Vice Chair of the Amicus Committee of the Intellectual Property Section.

On October 7, 2020, Goldstein represented Google in Google LLC v. Oracle America, Inc., his 44th argument before the U.S. Supreme Court.

Media and professional recognition
Goldstein has been recognized as:
 One of the 100 most influential lawyers in the nation  (National Law Journal, 2006 and 2013)
 One of the 40 most influential lawyers of the decade  (National Law Journal)
 One of the 90 Greatest Washington Lawyers of the Last 30 Years  (Legal Times).
 Fellow, American Academy of Appellate Lawyers

References

External links
Golstein previews the 2008 Supreme Court docket in the Harvard Law Record

1970 births
American legal scholars
Washington College of Law alumni
Lawyers from Washington, D.C.
Place of birth missing (living people)
University of North Carolina at Chapel Hill alumni
Harvard Law School faculty
Living people
Members of the American Law Institute